The Webb Brothers Block on E. Main Ave. in Bismarck, North Dakota has also been known as the Sears Block. The building was built in 1898–1899 with an addition  added in 1906. 
It was listed on the National Register of Historic Places in  1983.

Webb Brothers Department Store
The Webb Brothers Department Store occupied  the building from 1899.
The Webb brothers, William Henry Webb, Jr.  (1862-1945) and Philip Barnard Webb (1859-1952), were born in England and immigrated to the United States with their parents in 1871. They  arrived in Dakota Territory in 1883. They came to Bismarck in 1884  and opened a furniture store. In addition to retail, the brothers were also active in real estate in Bismarck. William   Webb served as   Mayor of Bismarck 1905–1907. In the 1920s,  Philip Webb sold his share of the business to his brother  and then retired in Los Angeles.

References

Commercial buildings on the National Register of Historic Places in North Dakota
Neoclassical architecture in North Dakota
Commercial buildings completed in 1899
Commercial buildings completed in 1906
1899 establishments in North Dakota
National Register of Historic Places in Bismarck, North Dakota